HMS Sturgeon was the lead ship of the s which served with the Royal Navy.  Built by Vickers, she was launched in 1894 and sold in 1910.

Construction and design
On 8 November 1893, the British Admiralty placed an order with the Naval Construction and Armament Company of Barrow-in-Furness (later to become part of Vickers) for three "Twenty-Seven Knotter" destroyers as part of the 1893–1894 construction programme for the Royal Navy, with in total, 36 destroyers being ordered from various shipbuilders for this programme.

The Admiralty only laid down a series of broad requirements for the destroyers, leaving detailed design to the ships' builders.

Three funnels were fitted, with the foremast between the ship's bridge and the first funnel. The ship's crew was 53 officers and men.

Service
Sturgeon served in home waters for the whole of her career. She took part in the fleet review held at Spithead on 26 June 1897 to celebrate the Diamond Jubilee of Queen Victoria. From 1899 she served in the Medway Instructional Flotilla under Commander Murray MacGregor Lockhart, but in March 1900 she was replaced by HMS Cynthia to which Commander Lockhart also transferred. She left this for other service in late 1900. The following year she again took up with the Medway instructional flotilla, replacing . She had a refit in early 1902. In May 1902 she received the officers and men from the destroyer , and was again commissioned at Chatham on 8 May by Lieutenant John Maxwell D. E. Warren for service with the Flotilla. She took part in the Spithead fleet review held on 16 August 1902 for the coronation of King Edward VII, and later the same month was placed in dockyard hands at Sheerness for her boiler to be re-tubed.

Notes

References
 
 

 
 

Sturgeon-class destroyers
Ships built in Barrow-in-Furness
1894 ships
Victorian-era destroyers of the United Kingdom